The Port of Montreal (ACI Canadian Port Code: 0395, UN/LOCODE: CA MTR) is a cruise and transshipment point located on the St. Lawrence River in Montreal, Québec, Canada. The port operates as an international container port where it services Toronto and the rest of Central Canada, the Midwestern United States, and the Northeastern United States.

In 2019, more than 2,000 cargo ships visited with the port handling 40,500,000 metric tonnes of consumer goods, machinery, cereal, sugar, petroleum products, and other types of cargo. Montreal also welcomes cruise ships. The port is operated by the Montreal Port Authority.

History 
The port originated in the historic area now known as the Old Port of Montreal. Over the years, the Port of Montreal expanded eastward along the waterfront. In 1978, the Port of Montreal ceded the area now known as the Old Port to the Old Port of Montreal Corporation, a public corporation responsible for developing tourism and recreational activities in the area. The site is now a cultural gem and a major tourist attraction, having been enhanced with museums, restaurants, shops and water-related activities. Today, most Port of Montreal facilities are located downstream from the Old Port. The Montreal Port Authority's head office and the multipurpose Bickerdike Terminal are located upstream from the Old Port.

Timeline 

Starting from the first authority:
 1830: The first Harbour Commission is created. It built the first permanent wharves and pressed the government to dredge the river.
 1830–1832:  of docks are built.
 1840: The Gold-Headed Cane tradition begins, giving a cane to the captain of the first vessel to reach the port in the year.
 1902: Start of construction of modern grain elevators in the port.
 1908: First permanent transit sheds constructed.
 1910: Project to deepen the channel to  began.
 1936: The federal government creates the National Harbours Board.
 1947: More than 25 steamship lines serve the port for seven and a half months of the year.
 1962: The federal government decides to use icebreakers to keep the channel open between Montreal and Quebec City during winter.
 1964: Year-round navigation begins in Montreal. In 1962, the Canadian Coast Guard began to use icebreakers to keep the St. Lawrence navigation channel open, first and foremost as an environmental measure designed to protect riverside communities from spring floods caused by ice jams. Year-round navigation to and from the port began in 1964.
 1967: The port handles its first container.
 1968: Canada's first container terminal is inaugurated in Montreal.
 1972: Construction begins on Cast container terminal.
 1977: The port handles its one-millionth TEU container.

 1978: The port builds Racine container terminal and expands its operations in Montreal's east end.
 1983: The Montreal Port Corporation is established.
 1987: Maisonneuve container terminal (Termont) opens.
 1996: Three brand-new vessels, capable of carrying 2,300 TEU containers each, are christened in Montreal.
 1998: Two shipping lines take delivery of three ships capable of transporting 2,800 TEU containers or the equivalent.
 1999: Under the Canada Marine Act, the Montreal Port Corporation becomes the more autonomous Montreal Port Authority.
 2000: The Port of Montreal handles more than 1 million TEU containers a year for the first time in its history.
 2006: The port reaches a new milestone by handling more than 25 million tonnes of cargo.
 2008: Electronic navigation system is implemented from Montreal to the mouth of the Gulf of St. Lawrence.
 2011: The port opens a new common entry portal for trucks, transfers the management of its grain terminal operations to Viterra Inc., and reaches a new milestone by handling more than 28 million tonnes of cargo.
 2020: A series of labour disputes shut down the Port as part of the 2020 Port of Montreal strike.

Economy 

Maritime and port activity in Montreal supports some 18,280 jobs and provides $1.5 billion in economic benefits to the Canadian economy (Secor study, 2008).

The three levels of government recognize the importance of the Port of Montreal to the economy and are supporting the port on various projects. For example, the Province of Québec announced in May 2013 the signature of a collaborative framework with the City of Montreal for the extension of a thoroughfare that will link with port facilities. The province also announced the construction of an exit ramp from a major highway that will allow trucks to directly reach the port, and the reconfiguration of an entrance ramp on the same highway that will provide trucks leaving the port with direct access to the highway network. The two projects will improve truck access at the Port of Montreal.

The federal government announced in March 2012 that it would contribute up to $15.1 million toward two projects that will increase the port's container-handling capacity. At the same time it announced a subsidy of $500,000 toward the second phase of an electronic navigation project in the St. Lawrence River channel between Quebec City and Montreal.

The Port of Montreal was behind the creation of the Logistics and Transportation Metropolitan Cluster of Montreal, or Cargo Montreal, an initiative that will help consolidate Montreal as a centre for goods transportation.  The project is supported by the Metropolitan Community and its activities are financially supported by Québec's Finance and Economy Ministry, Executive Council Ministry, the Montreal Metropolitan Community and all Cargo Montreal members, while Transport Canada is a participant.

Markets

Export areas 
The port serves many diversified markets within North America. In 2012, 74.1% of the port's containerized cargo traffic was destined for or came from the Canadian market, mainly Québec (34.7%), Ontario (26.9%) and Western Canada (9.1%). The other 25.9% of containerized cargo traffic was destined for or came from the United States, mainly the Midwest (18.4%), and as a result, the port is a major source of truck traffic for Ontario's Highway 401.

The port has appointed representatives in the U.S., Europe and Asia to promote its advantages in those markets.

Import areas 
In 2012, Northern Europe was the point of origin or final destination for 46.8% of the containers moving through the port, followed by the Mediterranean (19%), Asia (13.7%), the Middle East (7.4%), Latin America (5.9%) and Africa/Oceania (4.0%). Domestic cargo accounted for 3.2% of the port's containerized cargo traffic. The port continues to benefit from traffic moving through the Suez Canal and the Panama Canal thanks to the direct services that shipping lines provide between Montreal and transhipment ports in the Mediterranean and the Caribbean.

Port territory 

On the island of Montreal, port territory stretches along  of the waterfront from the Victoria Bridge at the upstream end of the port to Pointe-aux-Trembles at the downstream end of the port.
 
The port owns land along  of the waterfront at Contrecoeur. This land will be used to increase the port's container-handling capacity once its land on the island of Montreal reaches full capacity.

Environment 

The Port of Montreal is a founding member of Green Marine, a voluntary environmental program for the maritime industry in Canada and the United States. Green Marine addresses environmental issues such as greenhouse gases, cargo residues, conflict of use (noise, dust, odours, luminous pollution), water and soil pollution prevention, and environmental leadership. In Green Marine's most recent progress report, on a scale of 1 to 5, where Level 5 corresponds to the highest performance rating possible, the Port of Montreal scored Level 4 for its efforts to reduce greenhouse gas emissions, and Level 5 for its efforts to reduce conflict of use and for its environmental leadership.

Under its locomotive replacement program, the port has purchased four multiple-generator – or GenSet – locomotives. GenSet technology reduces fuel consumption by about 50% and greenhouse gas emissions by 90% compared to traditional locomotives.

The Montreal Port Authority manages the Boucherville Islands Archipelago, which is located at the downstream end of the port. The port authority is completing work to provide fish with spawning areas at several islands of the archipelago as part of an agreement with the Fisheries and Oceans Canada Fish Habitat Management Branch. The Coastal Fisheries Protection Act calls for the creation or improvement of habitant banks as compensation for the impact of development projects, such as the development of berths, on the environment.

Port infrastructure and characteristics 

Terminals

Container 
Container ships are completely unloaded and loaded. Container shipping lines calling the port include CMA CGM, Hapag-Lloyd, Maersk Line, Mediterranean Shipping Company and OOCL.

The port has three international container terminals. Montreal Gateway Terminals Partnership operates two of the terminals and Termont Montreal Inc. operates the other. Empire Stevedoring Co. Ltd. operates a terminal that handles domestic containers. These facilities cover an area of approximately 90 hectares (36 acres) and have 15 dockside gantry cranes with lifting capacities ranging from 40 to 65 tonnes, yard gantry cranes and other container-handling equipment.

Grain 
The port signed an agreement in 2011 with Viterra Inc., to lease and operate the port's grain terminal. Total grain traffic through the port increased by 76.3% to 3,070,054 tonnes in 2012, the first full year of operation of the grain terminal under Viterra.  The grain terminal is a combined loading and unloading facility that has a total storage capacity of 260,000 tonnes.

Dry bulk (other than grain) 
Iron ore, salt, fertilizers, copper ore, raw sugar and gypsum are among the major commodities handled. Logistec Stevedoring Inc. operates the port's dry bulk facilities.

Liquid bulk 

Six petroleum companies: Canterm Canadian Terminals Inc., Shell Canada Products, Suncor Energy, Terminal Montréal Est, Terminal Norcan Inc. and Ultramar Ltd. handle petroleum products at port facilities. Two companies Vopak Terminals Canada Inc. and Lallemand Inc. move other liquid bulk products.

Passenger cruise and Leisure 
The port authority directly operates a cruise passenger terminal, the port's Iberville Passenger Terminal. It welcomed 127,087 passengers and crew members in 2018.

Transportation 

The port authority provides facilities to shipping lines and land carriers, to terminal operators and to freight transport. It builds and maintains infrastructures that it leases to private stevedoring companies.

Management 
The Montreal Port Authority operates the Port of Montreal and is a member of: the Association of Canadian Port Authorities (CPA), the American Association of Port Authorities, and the International Association of Ports and Harbors (IAPH). The port authority is an autonomous self-financing federal agency created under the terms of the Canada Marine Act.

The port authority's board of directors is composed of seven business people from the Montreal area. Each of three levels of government – federal, provincial and municipal – names a director. The federal transport minister, on the recommendation of port users, names the remaining four directors. The board elects its own chairman.
As of 2016 the Port Authority had 237 employees, total revenue from operations was $106.7 million and its net earnings totalled $23.5 million.

International seaports agreements 
 – Port of Antwerp, Belgium (2021)
 – Port of Marseille-Fos, France (2020)
 – Port of Tianjin, China
 – Mundra Port, Gujarat State, India (2018) Memorandum of Understanding (MOU)

Awards 
The Port of Montreal has won numerous awards for its work in communications, the cruise sector, infrastructure and management.

The port won three awards in the American Association of Port Authorities’ (AAPA) 2013 Communications Competition. The port won an Award of Excellence for its new website, an Award of Distinction for its PortInfo electronic magazine, and an Award of Merit for its new branding campaign “Trading with the World.”

The port also won the International Association of Ports and Harbors’ (IAPH) bronze 2013 Port Communications Award. The prize recognizes a project that provides free Wi-Fi on Port of Montreal territory to seafarers whose ships are docked in port. The service allows mariners to connect more easily with family and friends back home.

In the cruise sector, the port won an award for its cruise operations from Cruise Insight magazine for a fifth consecutive year in 2013. It won the Most Efficient Port Services award, which recognizes the port's combination of port agency and customs services and its working relationship with cruise line operations departments.

In 2012, the port won four Cruise Insight awards of excellence: Most Responsive Port, Best Turnaround Destination, Most Efficient Terminal Operator and Best Turnaround Port Operations.

In 2011, the port won awards as Most Efficient Terminal Operator and Best Turnaround Destination., and in 2010 it won Best Turnaround Port Operations and Best Turnaround Destination.

Also in 2011, the port won the Grand Prize for Excellence in the Cargo Transportation category from Québec's road transportation association, the Association québécoise du transport et des routes, for the successful completion of its new entry portal for trucks on port territory.

In 2012, port president and CEO Sylvie Vachon received the Prix Orchidée from the East Montreal Chamber of Commerce. The award honours a VIP who makes both a commitment and an outstanding contribution to East Montreal's economic and social development.

See also 

 Board of Trade of Metropolitan Montreal
 Maritime Rescue Sub-Centre Quebec
 List of North American ports
 List of world's busiest container ports
 Container on barge

References

External links 
 

Buildings and structures in Montreal
Ports and harbours of Quebec
River ports of Canada
Saint Lawrence Seaway
Transport in Montreal